Chaman is a village in Taher Gurab Rural District, in the Central District of Sowme'eh Sara County, Gilan Province, Iran. At the 2006 census, its population was 348, in 76 families.

References 

Populated places in Sowme'eh Sara County